Thomas Felstead (1887-1956) was a professional footballer, who played for Huddersfield Town.

References 

English footballers
Association football goalkeepers
English Football League players
Huddersfield Town A.F.C. players
1887 births
1956 deaths